Hypostomus variipictus is a species of catfish in the family Loricariidae. It is native to South America, where it occurs in the Rio Grande basin in Brazil, with its type locality being given as the Pardo River. The species reaches 37 cm (14.6 inches) in total length and is believed to be a facultative air-breather. Within its range, it may be confused with the related species Hypostomus margaritifer, and some specimens of H. variipictus have previously been thought to represent an atypical color morph of H. margaritifer.

References 

variipictus
Fish described in 1911